Marcos Aurelio Mateo Lora (born April 18, 1984) is a Dominican right-handed former professional baseball pitcher. He has played in Major League Baseball (MLB) for the Chicago Cubs and in Nippon Professional Baseball (NPB) for the Hanshin Tigers.

Playing career

Cincinnati Reds
In 2004, Mateo was signed as an amateur free agent by the Cincinnati Reds. Upon joining the Reds, Mateo joined their Rookie level minor league affiliate, the Gulf Coast League (GCL) Reds. In one season with the GCL Reds, he pitched in 13 games, had a 4–3 win–loss record, a 4.30 Earned Run Average (ERA), and a 1.46 WHIP. For the 2006 season, he joined the Billings Mustangs of the Pioneer League where in 18 games, he went 5–1 with a 4.30 ERA and a 1.40 WHIP. Mateo joined the Class-A Dayton Dragons in 2007 where he put together a 3.50 ERA, 63 strikeouts, and a 1.278 WHIP in 41 games.

Chicago Cubs
On September 12, 2007, after Dayton's season was over, Mateo was traded to the Chicago Cubs as the player to be named later from the trade that saw Buck Coats be traded to the Reds on August 30.

To begin the 2008 season, Mateo joined the Cubs' Class-A affiliate in Peoria. In eight games, he struck out 20 batters in just 15 innings pitched, which prompted a call-up to the Daytona Cubs, the High-A affiliate of Chicago. Mateo pitched in 25 games for Daytona, recording a 3.57 ERA, a 1.31 WHIP, and 65 strikeouts. His performance with both Peoria and Daytona prompted the Cubs to add him to their 40-man roster on November 11 to protect him from being selected in the Rule 5 draft. MLB.com, at the same time, considered Mateo to be a "top prospect" for the Cubs. Mateo started the 2009 season with Daytona again, but was quickly promoted after not allowing a run in nine innings. Reportedly, the Cubs wanted to test him out as a starting pitcher before calling him up to Double-A. On April 26, Mateo made his debut for the Tennessee Smokies, the Cubs' Double-A affiliate. He pitched 3 2/3 innings for the Smokies, walked four and struck out one, but only allowed one run. In 34 total games for Tennessee, he would make a total of 13 other starts and finished the season with a 4.07 ERA, a 1.44 WHIP, and 70 strikeouts in 97.1 innings pitched.

Mateo began the 2010 season with Tennessee, recording a 2.18 ERA, a 1.258 WHIP, and 29 strikeouts, before being called up to the Triple-A Iowa Cubs at the end of July. He pitched eight games for Iowa, before being called up to the Cubs on August 9, 2010, replacing Mitch Atkins on the 25-man roster. In his major league debut, Mateo came into the game in the 11th inning and gave up a sacrifice fly to Pat Burrell of the San Francisco Giants, which allowed the winning run to score for the Giants. Mateo had given up two hits and a walk to load the bases before Burrell drove in the winning run. He would go on to pitch in 20 more games for Chicago in 2010, recording a 5.82 ERA, a 1.338 WHIP, and 26 strikeouts in 21.2 innings of work.

During Spring training 2011, Mateo was on the roster bubble for a spot in the bullpen and was in a race with veterans Carlos Silva and Braden Looper for the final pitching spot on the team. However, on March 26, Mateo ended up winning the battle as both Looper and Silva were released by the team. On June 1, 2012, Mateo underwent Tommy John surgery which ended his 2012 season.

Arizona Diamondbacks
On December 12, 2013, Mateo was selected by the Arizona Diamondbacks with the fifteenth pick of the Rule 5 draft.

Second Stint with Cubs
On March 13, he was returned to the Cubs.

San Diego Padres
He signed a minor league contract with the San Diego Padres in January 2015. On January 12, 2015 he was assigned to AAA El Paso Chihuahuas.

Dominican Winter League
Marcos Mateo broke a save record with 21 saves in the 2014–2015 season with the Estrellas Orientales.

Hanshin Tigers
Mateo signed with the Hanshin Tigers of Nippon Professional Baseball for the 2016 season.

Ishikawa Million Stars
On March 30, 2019, he signed with the Ishikawa Million Stars of the Baseball Challenge League.

References

External links

NPB statistics

1984 births
Living people
Arizona League Cubs players
Billings Mustangs players
Chicago Cubs players
Daytona Cubs players
Dominican Republic expatriate baseball players in Japan
Dominican Republic expatriate baseball players in the United States
El Paso Chihuahuas players
Estrellas Orientales players
Gulf Coast Reds players
Hanshin Tigers players
Iowa Cubs players
Ishikawa Million Stars players

Major League Baseball pitchers
Major League Baseball players from the Dominican Republic
Nippon Professional Baseball pitchers
People from San Cristóbal Province
Peoria Chiefs players
San Diego Padres players
Tennessee Smokies players